Trens Intercidades (TIC) is a four line regional rail network proposed by the government of the State of São Paulo in Brazil, linking the city of São Paulo with Jundiaí, Campinas, São José dos Campos, Sorocaba and Santos.

Background
In 2010, São Paulo state government showed off a project to build up 4 regional intercity trains routes connecting the area surrounding São Paulo with high population cities close by, which today rely exclusively on intercity buses that are almost completely saturated and running at absurdly short intervals at full capacity. The original plan was for construction to start 2013–2014, but the Brazilian financial crisis that it is suffering since 2015 has put all projects on standby, and the next prediction is for construction to start only by 2020. In 2016 the Brazilian government confirmed it was seeking South Korean assistance with the development of a São Paulo regional rail network and in 2019, the cost was estimated at R$ 20 billion.

Lines

São Paulo to Sorocaba 
The first line will depart from Água Branca interchange station in São Paulo and end in Sorocaba, a 500.000 inhabitants city about 100 km west of São Paulo, stopping midway at São Roque and a populous neighborhood of Sorocaba, Brigadeiro Tobias. The complete journey will take around 50 minutes

São Paulo to Santos 
The second line will depart from the to-be-built São Carlos interchange station in São Paulo and head to Santos, a 430.000 inhabitants city 50 km south of São Paulo, in the coast, which an important beach town as well as Brazil's most important freight port. The train will stop in 2 cities along the way. The complete journey will take around 35 minutes.

Options considered for this route include a new 30 km tunnel between Pref. Celso Daniel-Santo André station on Line 10–Turquoise and São Vicente.

São Paulo to Campinas and Americana 
The third, and probably the most important and urgent line, is the line connecting São Paulo's Água Branca interchange station to Jundiaí, Campinas and Americana. Campinas is one of Brazil's largest regional centers, it is just 90 km north of São Paulo, and has its own Metropolitan area with over 3 million inhabitants, Jundiaí is a 400.000 inhabitants city in between them, and Americana is a 200.000 inhabitants city in the north limit of the Campinas Region. The journey from São Paulo to Jundiaí will take 20 minutes, to Campinas around 40 to 50 minutes and Americana just over an hour.

São Paulo to São José dos Campos 
The fourth route will leave from the Penha intermodal station and head to São José dos Campos, a 710.000 inhabitants city 100 km east of São Paulo, which is a very important tech center, with the headquarters of Embraer, for example, two public and multiple private universities, and which also possesses a large industrial complex, ranging from automotive and military to chemical and metal-mechanical.

Other routes 
There are also future plans for other important routes such as from Sorocaba to Paulínia, Campinas to Piracicaba and Campinas to Rio Claro.

See also
 São Paulo Metro
 Companhia Paulista de Trens Metropolitanos
 Expresso Pequi

References

Electric railways in Brazil
5 ft 3 in gauge railways in Brazil
Rail transport in Brazil